Acanthoponera mucronata is a species of ant belonging to the genus Acanthoponera. Described in 1860 by Roger, the species is native to South America.

References

Heteroponerinae
Hymenoptera of South America
Insects described in 1860